Schistura conirostris is a species of ray-finned fish in the stone loach genus Schistura from China.

References 

C
Fish described in 1982